Ilyukhinskaya is a rural locality (a village) in Vozhbalskoye Rural Settlement, Totemsky District, Vologda Oblast, Russia. The population was 1 as of 2002.

Geography 
Ilyukhinskaya is located 70 km northwest of Totma (the district's administrative centre) by road. Nikitinskaya is the nearest rural locality.

References 

Rural localities in Tarnogsky District